Wat'a (Quechua for island, Hispanicized spelling Huata) is an archaeological site in Peru. It lies in the Huánuco Region, Huamalíes Province, Singa District, in the little community of Bella Flores north of Singa.

See also 
 Awila Qhincha Mach'ay
 Qillqay Mach'ay

References 

Archaeological sites in Huánuco Region
Archaeological sites in Peru